Marcus Johnson may refer to:

Politics
 Marcus E. Johnson (1887–?), former member of the Wisconsin State Assembly
 Marcus Theodore Johnson, British businessman and member of the Legislative Council of Hong Kong

Sports
 Marcus Johnson (offensive lineman) (born 1981), American former NFL player
 Marcus Johnson (wide receiver) (born 1994), American active NFL player
 Marcus Johnson (boxer) (born 1973), American boxer who fought Taurus Sykes 
 Marcus Johnson Jr. (born 1995), American basketball player
 Marques Johnson (born 1956), American former basketball player

Other uses
 Marcus Johnson (jazz musician), American jazz musician, producer and entrepreneur
 Marcus Johnson (actor), featured in Redemption: The Stan Tookie Williams Story, The Condemned and Deacons for Defense
 Marcus Johnson (comics), Marvel comics character

See also
Marc Johnson (disambiguation)
Marquis Johnson (born 1988), American football player